Chesterville is a village in the township of North Dundas, within the United Counties of Stormont, Dundas and Glengarry. It is located north of Morrisburg, west of Cornwall and south-east of Ottawa. The village is situated along the South Nation River.

History

Early Settlement
The land in what would become Dundas County was granted in 1784 to United Empire Loyalists, most of whom had fought with the King's Royal Regiment of New York during the American Revolution. Chesterville's first settlement was located along the South Nation River on Lot 18, Concession 4 of the former Winchester Township. The plot of land was originally granted to Marianne Duncan, the daughter of UE Loyalist Captain Richard Duncan, in 1797. George Hummell purchased the property from Marianne's estate in 1823.

In 1825, two Merkley brothers travelled down the Nation River with plans to establish a mill on land near Hummell's property. The Merkley brothers travelled to Waddington, New York to secure supplies for a raising bee, but on the return trip their canoe upset and both men drowned.

Around 1828, Thomas Armstrong and his son John established a saw mill and later a grist mill on land purchased from Hummel, and by 1838 it had attracted many settlers to the area, the settlement subsequently being named Armstrong's Mills. In these early days, the post and mail had to be collected by individuals from the mail office in Morrisburg, Ontario or Cornwall, Ontario, but in 1845 a post office was opened under the name of Winchester and the mail was delivered by horseback from Morrisburg.

Historical records suggest that although the post office was officially named Winchester, the community was known locally as Chesterville as early as the 1840s, and for a short time as Hummelville. The name East Winchester also seems to have been used during the 1860s and 1870s.

In July 1872, a telegraph office was opened in the village. Because the names of many local communities included the name Winchester (such as Winchester Township, West Winchester, East Winchester, North Winchester, and Winchester Springs), the Montreal Telegraph Company suggested that the name of the village be changed to avoid confusion. After a petition was circulated, the name was officially changed to Chesterville in 1875.

In 1887, the Canadian Pacific Railway opened a station in the town, leading to further settlement and incorporation as a village in 1890. The town hall was built in 1867 and was subsequently used as a fire hall, jailhouse, court house, and movie theatre, and currently serves as the heritage center and museum.

The old iron bridge, built in 1888 to cross the Nation River and connect both sides of town, was replaced by a larger concrete bridge on November 21, 1950. The old iron bridge had replaced a smaller wooden one built in the 1840s.

Great Fire of 1909
 
On 6 April 1909, part of Chesterville's business section was destroyed by fire. Newspaper accounts state that the fire started at the north-east corner of King and Water Streets (now 1 King Street) in a wooden-framed building that contained the tailor shop of W. J. Nash on the first floor and the Masonic Hall on the second. The flames travelled in two directions: East down Water Street to the Chesterville Record office, which destroyed the printing presses; and North up King Street, jumping from one building to the next until it reached Ralph Street. The King Street businesses affected (in order from Water Street to Ralph) were: Nash's tailor shop, Wilford Saucier's jewellery store, Isaac Pelletier's confectionary and fruit store, Gordon Robinson's blacksmith shop, Joseph Fisher and Colborne Robinson's butcher shop and the Sanders, Soule and Casselman general store.

The village could do very little to stop it, as they had only one hand pump and pails for water. This was the second major fire on that they had seen in a short period; exactly three weeks earlier on 16 March, fire broke out at the North end of King Street, burning down the Temperance Hotel and Foster's Hall and damaging the CPR train station and water tower.

Following these incidents, the village quickly took steps to improve their fire protection. In May, a by-law was prepared by the village council to mandate that only "fireproof" buildings (such as brick and stone) could be constructed in the business section of town. In the summer of 1909, the village purchased a steam pumper fire engine. Frank McCloskey was appointed fire chief and formed a brigade. However, the first fire hydrants were not installed in the village until 1916, when Hires Condensed Milk Co. (later Nestle) installed a water main along Queen and Main Streets.

After losing their printing presses in the fire, the Chesterville Record staff worked from a temporary office in Thomas McMahon's blacksmith shop on Main Street south of the CPR line. They resumed printing on 6 May 1909. Because they were so quick to return to business, news articles and advertisements exist that tell the progress of the town's recovery from this disaster.

In the year that followed, new buildings were erected to replace those that were lost. Sanders, Soule and Casselman rebuilt their store on its previous site (south-east corner of King and Ralph, now 19 King Street). The Fisher Block was constructed next door, and Joe Fisher and Isaac Pelletier continued their businesses there. It burned down in 1989 and now serves as a parking lot. A new office for the Chesterville Record was built at what is now 7 King Street. Part of the building was rented out by Wilford Saucier, who carried on his jewellery business. The Record remained there until the summer of 2018, and the office was demolished in December of that year. The Hamilton Block, built by Wesley Hamilton, replaced W. J. Nash's tailor shop on the north-east corner of King and Water Streets. It includes what is now 1, 3, and 5 King Street.

Ice storm of 1998

Between January 4 and 10, 1998, over 80 millimeters of freezing rain fell in the area, greatly damaging the power grid and infrastructure. Hydro poles and power lines were crumpled and broken. Shelters were established throughout North Dundas, and Chesterville hosted 100 beds, 75 at the Fawcet Pub, and 25 at the Legion Hall. The village power grid was restored on January 10, but many individual homes were without power for further days. 114 soldiers from the Royal Canadian Dragoons were billeted at North Dundas District High School during Operation Recuperation, the largest peacetime deployment of the Canadian Army. Prime Minister Jean Chretien visited the area along with Ontario Premier Mike Harris.

Military History
The military history of Dundas County and Chesterville dates back to the early settlement days, when Loyalist veterans of the American Revolution were granted plots of land in Upper Canada and raised a local militia. Some of the earliest settlers to Winchester Township were veterans of the Revolution, and many more were veterans of the War of 1812. Dundas County had raised a militia as far back as 1788, and during the War of 1812 the men fought with the 1st Regiment of Dundas Militia. Many of these veterans would be granted plots of land in Dundas County, settling in Winchester Township.

In 1837, the Dundas County Militia was reorganized into two battalions with the 1st Battalion (Winchester and Williamsburg Townships) commanded by Col. John Crysler and Lt-Col. J. McDonell. The Embodied Dundas Militia fought during the Rebellions of 1837–1838 at the Battle of the Windmill. In 1842, the Dundas Militia was again reorganized into three battalions, the 3rd Battalion serving Winchester and Mountain Townships, and finally in 1852 into four battalions, the 4th Battalion headquartered in Winchester Township in Chesterville.

With the passage of the Militia Act of 1855, the counties of Leeds, Dundas, Stormont and Glengarry became part of Military District No. 2, and in the militia report for 1859, the 4th Battalion (Winchester) was commanded by Lt-Col. J.P. Crysler.

Men from Chesterville and district served along the St. Lawrence River during the Fenian Raids in 1866 and 1870, and during the Second Boer War, including Troopers Alfred Ault, Alfred E. Bolster, Alexander W.C. Munro, and Trooper Lorne W. R. Mulloy, who was awarded the Distinguished Conduct Medal at the Battle of Witpoort.

World War I 

During World War One, many men from Chesterville served with the 154th (Stormont-Dundas-Glengarry) Battalion, CEF and other regiments in France and Belgium. Some of the men from Chesterville district who were killed in the war were:
 Sergeant James Alexander Clement (1897-1917), 154th (Stormont-Dundas-Glengarry) Battalion, CEF and 3rd Battalion (Toronto Regiment), CEF
 Private Henry Coughler (1885-1918), 28th Battalion (Northwest), CEF
 Lieutenant Wilfred Ellis Durant (1895-1918), No. 29 Squadron RAF
 Private Charles Brown Forward (1882-1915), 16th (Canadian Scottish) Battalion, CEF - Killed at the Battle of Festubert
 Private Orry Francis Harper (1872-1918), 154th (Stormont-Dundas-Glengarry) Battalion, CEF - Killed at the Second Battle of Arras
 Private William Edward Hayes (1885-1916), 1st Battalion (Ontario Regiment), CEF

 Private Arthur Meharey Hummel (1891-1917), Princess Patricia's Canadian Light Infantry - Killed at the Second Battle of Passchendaele
 Private Charles "Clifford" Hummel (1891-1918), 46th Battalion (South Saskatchewan), CEF
 Private Ransom "Howard" Hess (1899-1918), Princess Patricia's Canadian Light Infantry - Killed at the Battle of Amiens (1918)
 Lance Corporal Ernest Eugene MacMillan (1897-1917), 12th Company, Canadian Machine Gun Corps - Killed at the Second Battle of Passchendaele
 Private Edwin Arnold Merkley (1899-1918), 87th Battalion (Canadian Grenadier Guards), CEF
 Sergeant Harold Adam Merkley (1895-1918), 54th Battalion
 Lieutenant Myles Earl Merkley (1890-1917) MC, 31st (Alberta) Battalion, CEF - Killed in the Battle of Passchendaele
 Corporal William Brown Clark Moodie (1883-1917), 49th Battalion (Edmonton Regiment), CEF - Killed at the Battle of Vimy Ridge
 Private Napoleon Paul (1876-1917), 4th Battalion, Canadian Mounted Rifles - Killed at the Battle of Vimy Ridge
 Private Harold Clinton Shaver (1893-1918), Canadian Army Medical Corps

World War II 
 
During World War Two, men from Chesterville served with the Stormont, Dundas and Glengarry Highlanders among other regiments and the Royal Canadian Air Force. Some of the men from Chesterville and District who were killed in the war were:
 Lieutenant Harold Simeon Casselman (1916-1944), 17th Field Regiment, Royal Canadian Artillery - Killed in Italy
 Warrant Officer II Patrick "Kelly" Chambers (1918-1943), No. 432 Squadron RCAF - Killed over Belgium
 Pilot Officer Vincent "Harold" Coyne (1918-1944), 3 Ferry Unit, RAF
 Flight Sergeant Herbert Carl Empey (1921-1942), No. 142 Squadron RAF
 Pilot Officer Douglas Lloyd Marcellus (1925-1944), 419 Tactical Fighter Training Squadron, RCAF - Killed over Germany
 Pilot Officer Francis Simon Marcellus (1918-1944), No. 77 Squadron RAF
 Flying Officer Hubert Joseph MacMillan (1923-1945), No. 12 Squadron RAF - Killed over Holland
 Flying Officer George Lloyd McLaughlin (1917-1943), 419 Tactical Fighter Training Squadron, RCAF - Killed over Germany
 Sergeant John Edward O'Grady (1923-1943), 1659 Heavy Conversion Unit, RAF
 Private Bertram Rene Smith (1922-1944), 1st Canadian Infantry Brigade Workshop, RCEME - Killed over Italy

Korean War and Later Engagements 
During the Korean War, Private Curtis A. Hayes (1929-1951) of the Princess Patricia's Canadian Light Infantry, who had grown up south of Chesterville, was one of the ten Canadians killed at the Battle of Kapyong.

Men and women from Chesterville have since served in United Nations and NATO Peacekeeping missions around the world, and during the War in Afghanistan (2001-2021).

War Memorials 
 
On 10 November 1957, the Chesterville Legion unveiled the cenotaph on the grounds of the Community Hall (1 Mill Street) to honour those lost during the World Wars. Forty years later in 1997, the cenotaph was moved to a park on Queen Street and expanded to include wings on each side with names of local soldiers who died in World War I and II and the Korean War. It was unveiled on 28 September 1997 and in November of that year, the park was renamed Veterans Memorial Park.

In the spring and summer of 2015, the park was updated and a new pathway, flag pole, and benches were installed, along with extra floodlights and shrubbery. Part of this project also included relocating the Nation Valley Cenotaph to the park, which was completed in August. The Nation Valley Cenotaph was originally unveiled on 23 August 1922 on the grounds of Nation Valley Public School (S.S. No. 5) on River Road, west of Chesterville.

Geography
 
Located in the township of North Dundas, Ontario, it is bordered by North Stormont, Ontario to the north-east, Winchester to the west, South Dundas, Ontario to the south, and Russell, Ontario to the north. The village is surrounded by several small communities comprising the larger Chesterville District: Connaught, Limerick, The Boyne, Forward, Maple Ridge, Nation Valley, and Bethune Bush.

Demographics

Clubs and Community Groups

 Chesterville and District Historical Society: Established in 1984 at 14 Victoria Street (the Chesterville and District Heritage Centre)
 Chesterville and District Lions Club: established in 1987
 Chesterville Kayak Club: Established in 2010 
 Chesterville Masonic Lodge No.320 A.F.&A.M.: Established in 1874 on King Street, the original lodge was destroyed in the great fire of 1909. The Masonic and Oddfellows lodges combined in 1912 to build the lodge on Main Street 
 Independent Order of Oddfellows No.288: Established in 1892
 Rotary Club of Chesterville: Established in 1938, the Rotary Club has been involved with many of the projects and events in the village.  
 Nation Valley Snowmobile Association: Established in 1994
 Royal Canadian Legion Branch No.434: Established in 1946 and located on John Street until 1999 when a large new hall was built at the corner of Queen Street and Industrial Drive
 Chesterville and District Agricultural Society: Established in 1931 at 153 Queen Street (host of Chesterville fair)

Education

Current Schools 
St Mary Catholic School (JK-Grade 6): 67 Main Street South. St. Mary's Catholic School was originally built in 1903 as a red brick building consisting of two classrooms on the first level and a parish hall on the second level. From 1907 to 1972, the Sisters of Providence taught at the school. The original school was demolished in 1963 to make way for a larger, more modern school.
Chesterville Public School (JK-Grade 6): 38 College Street. Chesterville Public School was founded in 1902. The original building was demolished in 1963 and a more modern school was built directly beside it. Happy Face Nursery School operates out of this location, offering the following programs: Toddler (18–30 months of age), Preschool (2.5–6 years of age), Kindergarten (6–8 years of age), and School Age (8–13 years of age).
North Dundas District High School (Grades 7-12): 12835 County Road 43, Chesterville. North Dundas District High School was founded in 1963. Following a fire in 1962 that destroyed Winchester High School (founded 1914), the North Dundas District High School Board (later part of the SDG Board of Education, then the Upper Canada District School Board) built an amalgamated high school to service both  Winchester and Chesterville, as well as the surrounding areas. As a consequence, Chesterville High School (founded 1911), was demolished in 1963. Due to declining enrolment, Maple Ridge Senior Elementary School closed in 2011 and the North Dundas Intermediate School was created for grades 7 and 8. The Intermediate School is located on the second floor of NDDHS.

Former Schools 
 Chesterville High School (formerly Chesterville Continuation School): The Chesterville Continuation School Board was established in the summer of 1910 and classes began that September. Until the school building on College Street was completed in fall 1911, classes were held at Chesterville Public School. The high school was located on College Street, directly south of the current public school. In January 1951, the Winchester and Chesterville High School Boards merged to create the North Dundas High School District Board, which included both villages and Winchester Township (except Morewood). By the 1950s, the school was becoming overcrowded. Because Winchester High School was having a similar issue, debates arose about whether each school should be renovated, or if one centralized school should be built. When a fire destroyed Winchester High School in February 1962, the board finally decided to build one school half-way between the two villages. This school later became North Dundas District High School. The Chesterville High School building was closed in June 1963 and was demolished soon after.
 Maple Ridge Senior Public School (formerly Maple Ridge Public School, formerly S.S. 6 (Maple Ridge) Public School): The original schoolhouse is located on the north side of County Road 43, directly west of Maple Ridge Cemetery. The Maple Ridge schoolhouse, like many others in the area, closed at the end of 1966 when a new, larger school was opened in 1967 on the south side of County Road 43 across from North Dundas District High School. Maple Ridge Public School absorbed students from a number of local schoolhouses, including: S.S. No. 2 (Cass Bridge), S.S. No. 5 (Nation Valley), S.S. No. 6 (Maple Ridge), S.S. No. 8 (Forward), S.S. No. 9 (Limerick), S.S. No. 10 (Frood/Fruid), S.S. No. 16 (Bethune Bush), S.S. 18 (Boyne), and S.S. 20 (Summers). Maple Ridge became a senior public school in 1973, amidst controversy about a large addition to the school. Due to declining enrollment, Maple Ridge closed in June 2011.

Churches

 Christ Church United (formerly Trinity United Church, formerly Trinity Methodist Church): The first Methodist congregation was established in Chesterville prior to 1852. Around 1875, a brick church was built on Water Street, behind the current church building, which was constructed in 1908 and opened in 1909. The old church remained vacant until at least 1928. On 10 June 1925, the Methodist Church of Canada merged with the Congregational Union of Canada and part of the Presbyterian Church of Canada to become the United Church of Canada. On that date, Trinity Methodist Church became Trinity United Church. The Morewood United Church congregation joined with Chesterville in 1966 to create the Chesterville-Morewood (later Morewood-Trinity) pastoral charge with one minister serving both churches. Following the sale of the Morewood United Church, the pastoral charge voted to change the name of Trinity United to Christ Church United in 2013.
 The Gathering House (formerly Discovery Bible Fellowship): Originally known as the Discovery Bible Fellowship, this congregation was established on Palm Sunday (27 March) 1994. Until 2010, services were held in the gym of Winchester Public School. That year, the church bought the Fulton Block (2 Water Street) in Chesterville after plans to construct a building south of Winchester fell through. Until renovations were completed in March 2011, the congregation met at St. Andrew's Presbyterian Church. The official opening of The Gathering House (which was renamed in early 2010) was held on 4 and 5 June 2011. The church also operates a café in the building.
 Nationside Pentecostal Church: A Pentecostal congregation was established in Chesterville in 1949 by Rev. Walter Perry. Services were originally held in school houses, then later in the Chesterville Library and various homes in the village. In 1952, a lot on Albert Street (now 13 Albert Street) previously owned by Melvin Durant & Son was purchased, and a church was erected on the site in 1954. The church closed briefly from the late 1960s to mid 1970s, but was revived in 1976 by George Prosser and Gunther Benjatschek, two Bible College students. In the fall of 2013, the congregation decided to sell the church building as it no longer met modern building standards. The following year, they moved to a space in the Maple Ridge Centre (formerly Maple Ridge Senior Public School) at 12820 County Road 43, west of Chesterville, where they remained until early 2019. When the Maple Ridge Centre was closed and sold, the congregation moved to the former Nestle Factory in the village, located at 171 Main Street North, where they remain today.
St. Mary's Roman Catholic Church: Established and built in 1851, St Mary's is the oldest church building in the village. Earlier services had been offered in a log cabin south of the village. Chesterville became a separate parish from Morrisburg in 1882.
St. Andrew's Presbyterian Church - Presbyterian services had been offered as early as the 1840s, with meetings being held in the log homes and later the Town Hall. In 1888 the current church was established and built.

Landmarks

Nestlé factory
In 1918, Nestlé opened its first Canadian milk plant in Chesterville and began operation as The Maple Leaf Condensed Milk Company. The factory operated in Chesterville until 2006, when it ceased operations.

Newspapers
Chesterville Record (1894–present). The Chesterville Record is a weekly newspaper that was founded by Robert L. Harrop, the Chesterville station master. It was first published on December 12, 1894, and Thomas T. Shaw purchased the newspaper the following year. The Record office burned in the Great Fire of 1909 and was given a new home in 1910 when an office was built on King Street, where the business remained until 2018. T. T. Shaw sold the Record to George C. Lacey in 1915, who owned it until 1950. Lacey's daughter Helen, along with her husband Keith Graham, then became the co-publishers until they sold the newspaper to Blake Feeley and Wayne LaPrade in 1969. In 1976, the Record was sold to 2woMor Publications Inc., co-owned by brothers John and Robin Morris. Robin Morris eventually split from 2woMor Publications Inc. and established Etcetera Publications, under which he continued to publish the Chesterville Record. Robin Morris acted as editor of the Record for many years until his death on December 9, 2014. In August 2018, the newspaper was purchased by Linda Vogel, AJ Al-Rajab, and Donald Good. In June of that year, the business moved to 29 King Street and in December, the long-time office at 7 King Street was demolished.
Eastern Ontario Agri-News (1978–present). Eastern Ontario Agri-News is a monthly tabloid published by Etcetera Publications (owner of the Chesterville Record). It was first published in late February 1978 by John and Robin Morris, who at the time were co-owners of 2woMor Publications Inc. When Robin Morris broke off from the company and established Etcetera Publications, he continued to publish Agri-News.
Nation Valley News (2016–present). Nation Valley News is an all-digital news and advertising company founded and operated by Nelson Zandbergen.

Notable people

Hudson Allison (1881-1912), Montreal stock-broker and victim of the Titanic disaster. He was born in Chesterville in 1881 and worked as a clerk in Chester Casselman's general store. His wife, Bess Waldo Daniels, and their daughter, Helen “Loraine”, also perished in the sinking. Their infant son, Hudson “Trevor” Allison, survived the sinking. Hudson's body was recovered by the Mackay-Bennett and interred at Maple Ridge Cemetery, Chesterville.
Dewey Martin of the rock band Buffalo Springfield was born in Chesterville in 1940.
Orren D. Casselman (1861-1950), MP for Dundas (1917-1921), was born in Chesterville. He was the half-brother of William H. Casselman (see below).
William H. Casselman (1868-1941), MPP for Dundas (1919-1923). He was born in Chesterville and served as Reeve from 1931 until his death. He was the half-brother of Orren D. Casselman (see above).
Preston Elliott (1876-1939), MP for Dundas (1921-1925), was born in Chesterville.
Frederick McIntosh Cass (1913-2000), MPP for Grenville-Dundas (1955-1971), Minister of Highways (1959-1961), Minister of Municipal Affairs (1961-1962), Attorney-General of Ontario (1962-1964), and Speaker of the Legislative Assembly of Ontario (1968-1971), was born in Chesterville.
George Holmes Challies (1884-1976), MPP for Dundas (1929-1934), buried in Maple Ridge Cemetery, Chesterville.

See also

North Dundas, Ontario
Dundas County, Ontario

References

Communities in the United Counties of Stormont, Dundas and Glengarry
Former villages in Ontario